Christian Ugwuzor  is an Anglican bishop in Nigeria: he is the current Bishop of Aba, one of nine within the Anglican Province of Aba, itself one of 14 provinces within the Church of Nigeria.

Ugwuzor was born on 4 April 1963 in Umudim. He was educated at  the University of Calabar. He was ordained  deacon in  1992 and priest in 1993. He served in Asa-Umunka, Ukpakiri and Umuokpoji. He became a Canon in 2002 and Archdeacon in 2005. 
Ugwuzor has also been a prison chaplain,  secretary of Aba Synod and a lecturer in Church History at  Trinity Theological College, Umuahia. He was elected bishop in 2011.

Notes

Living people
1963 births
Prison chaplains
People from Anambra State
University of Calabar alumni
Anglican bishops of Aba
21st-century Anglican bishops in Nigeria
Trinity Theological College, Umuahia faculty
Church of Nigeria archdeacons